The 2021 New Orleans mayoral election was held on November 13, 2021, to elect the mayor of New Orleans, Louisiana. Originally scheduled to be held on October 9, 2021, the election was delayed five weeks by Louisiana Governor John Bel Edwards following heavy damage in the city by Hurricane Ida. A runoff was scheduled for December 11, 2021, but was ultimately unnecessary. The election was a Louisiana primary where all candidates appeared on the same ballot.

Incumbent mayor LaToya Cantrell was first elected in 2017 with 60.3% of the vote. During her re-election bid, she avoided a runoff after winning 64.7% of the vote.

Candidates

Democratic Party

Declared 
 Eldon "El" Anderson, community organizer
 Belden "Noonie Man" Batiste, activist and perennial candidate
 LaToya Cantrell, incumbent mayor
 Luke Fontana, attorney and artist
 Johnese Smith, 2017 candidate for mayor

Declined 
 Royce Duplessis, state representative from the 93rd district
 Helena Moreno, president of the New Orleans City Council

Republican Party

Declared 
 Vina Nguyen, businesswoman

Independent Party

Declared 
 Joseph Amato
 Douglas Bentley I
 Matthew Hill, 2017 candidate for mayor
 Nathaniel "Nate" Jones

No party affiliation

Declared 
 Manny "Chevrolet" Bruno, perennial candidate
 Byron Cole, 2017 candidate for mayor
 Leilani Heno, business owner and motivational speaker
 Reginald Merchant

Endorsements

Results

References 

New Orleans
New Orleans
2021
Mayoral election 2021